The Persian Sibyl - also known as the Babylonian, Chaldaean, Hebrew or Egyptian Sibyl - was the prophetic priestess presiding over the Apollonian oracle.

The word "Sibyl" comes (via Latin) from the ancient Greek word sibulla, meaning "prophetess". There were many Sibyls in the ancient world, but the Persian Sibyl allegedly foretold the exploits of Alexander of Macedon.  Nicanor, who wrote a life of Alexander, mentions her.

The Persian Sibyl has had at least three names: Sambethe, Helrea and Sabbe.

Sambethe was said to be of the family of Noah. A Persian Sibyl by Guercino hangs in the Capitoline Museum in Rome.

Pausanias, pausing at Delphi to enumerate four sibyls, mentions a "Hebrew sibyl":
there grew up among the Hebrews above Palestine, a woman who gave oracles named Sabbe, whose father was Berosus and her mother Erymanthe. Some say she was a Babylonian, while others call her an Egyptian Sibyl. 

The medieval Byzantine encyclopedia, the Suda, credits the Hebrew Sibyl as the author of the Sibylline oracles, a collection of texts of c. the 2nd to 4th century which were collected in the 6th century.

See also
 Sibylline oracles 
 Wives aboard the Ark

References 

Jewish Encyclopedia: Sibyl

External links

Sibyls